Thendral  is a popular Tamil drama serial telecast on Sun TV.

Thendral may also refer to

Thendral Sudum, a 1989 Tamil film
Thendral Varum Theru, a 1994 Tamil film
Thendral (film), a 2004 Tamil film
Global Tamil Vision, also known as Thendral TV
Nadodi Thendral, a 1992 Tamil film